
Gmina Skrzyszów is a rural gmina (administrative district) in Tarnów County, Lesser Poland Voivodeship, in southern Poland.

Villages
Gmina Skrzyszów contains the villages and settlements of Ładna, Łękawica, Pogórska Wola, Skrzyszów and Szynwałd.

Neighbouring gminas
Gmina Skrzyszów is bordered by the city of Tarnów and by the gminas of Czarna, Pilzno, Ryglice, Tarnów and Tuchów.

References
Polish official population figures 2006

Skrzyszow
Tarnów County